SAC (Rtd) Datuk Leong Chee Woh (11 November 1929 – 18 July 2021) was a Malaysian police officer.

Early life
Leong Chee Woh was born on 11 November 1929 in Taiping, Perak. He was adopted by a Chinese family of Baba-Nyonya descent. He furthered his studies at the King Edward VII School before his studies were interrupted by the Japanese occupation of Malaya.

After Japan surrendered, he sat for the Senior Cambridge Examination or also known as the Overseas Schooling Certificate Examination in 1949.

Prior to joining the police force, Leong initially worked as a Taiping Town Council clerk after the Japanese occupation, before serving as a chief clerk at the Selama Police District Headquarters.

Police career
Leong joined the Federation of Malaya Police on 1 December 1950 as Probationary Inspector and has undergone basic training at the Police Training Center in Jalan Gurney, Kuala Lumpur. Since he joined the police force during the Malayan Emergency, he naturally participated in the work against the Communists, he joined the Police Field Force in December 1951 to 1953.

As a result of his hardworking efforts, it led him to be transferred to Kuantan Special Branch on 1 April 1954. On 1 February 1956, he was promoted to Assistant Superintendent of Police and posted to Perak Special Branch. Leong was involved in several operations to eliminated Communist Party of Malaya such as Operation Ginger, Project Jukebox and Project Jujubes.

On 1 March 1968, Leong was posted to Sarawak Special Branch and facing the Sarawak Communist Organization. In addition, he was the founder of F team, the most elite undercover task force in Special Branch in March 1971 and was holding the rank of Superintendent of Police at that time.

Leong was promoted to Senior Assistant Commissioner of Police in the end of 1978 and served as deputy director (Operations) of Bukit Aman Special Branch. Subsequently, Leong was retired on 10 November 1984.

Death
At 18 July 2021, Leong died due to stroke in his residence at Seri Kembangan, Selangor.

Honours
 : 
 Recipient of the Mention In Despatches (KPK) (1959)
 :
 Member of the Order of the Defender of the Realm (AMN) (1966)
 Officer of the Order of the Defender of the Realm (KMN) (1975)
 Companion of the Order of the Defender of the Realm (JMN) (1981)
 Medal of the Order of the Defender of the Realm (PPN) (1984)
 Recipient of the Star of the Commander of Valour (PGB) (2017)
 :
 Member of the Most Exalted Order of the Star of Sarawak (ABS) (1973)
 Companion of the Most Exalted Order of the Star of Sarawak (JBS) (1983)
 :
 Member of the Order of the Crown of Pahang (AMP) (1980)
  :
 Commander of the Order of the Territorial Crown (PMW) – Datuk (2010)

Foreign Honours
 :
Tri Ta Phorn (1973)

Bibliography

References 

1929 births
Malaysian people of Chinese descent
2021 deaths
Malaysian police officers
People from Perak
Companions of the Order of the Defender of the Realm
Officers of the Order of the Defender of the Realm
Members of the Order of the Defender of the Realm
Medallists of the Order of the Defender of the Realm
Recipients of the Star of the Commander of Valour